Kim Jong-il (16 February 1941/1942 – 17 December 2011) was the Supreme Leader of North Korea from 1994 to 2011.

According to North Korean sources, Kim Jong-il published some 890 works during a period of his career from June 1964 to June 1994. According to the Korean Central News Agency (KCNA), the number of works from 1964 to 2001 was 550. In 2000, it was reported that the Workers' Party of Korea Publishing House has published at least 120 works by Kim. In 2009, KCNA put the numbers as follows:

Two collections exist, the Selected Works of Kim Jong-il (김정일선집) and the Complete Collection of Kim Jong-il's Works (김정일전집). Both contain forged works that Kim never wrote, included to give readers the impression that he was working with ideologically formulating the Juche idea in his youth. In reality, Kim only sporadically talked about the topic. When he did, mentions were typically backdated. For instance, a speech published in 1984 called On Some Questions in Understanding the Juche Philosophy (주체철학의 이해에서 제기되는 몇 가지 문제에 대하여) is dated February of 1974 and contains a plea that "it would be advisable not to publish my talk for the present" in an effort to explain why it had not been published immediately.

The Selected Works of Kim Jong-il (Enlarged Edition), whose publishing has continued posthumously, runs into volume 24 in Korean, and to volume 15 in English. Volumes three to eight were never published in English. The fact that new volumes are being added in such a peculiar order could also be an indication that the project is not a priority for the North Korean regime.

The Complete Collection of Kim Jong-il's Works is currently in volume 41. The earliest work in this collection is from July 1952, when Kim would have been only 11 years old.

Kim Jong-il did not enjoy speaking in public. That is why he chose to break with the tradition of New Year addresses delivered to live audiences that his father had. During Kim Jong-il's rule, New Year addresses were always published jointly in three newspapers – Rodong Sinmun, Joson Inmingun, and Chongnyon Jonwi –  instead. 

There is a "Kim Jong-il's Works Exhibition House" dedicated to his works in North Korea, holding 1,100 of his works and manuscripts.

In his teens and university years, Kim Jong-il wrote poems – notably "O Korea, I will Add Glory to Thee" (조선아 너를 빛내리). Kim Jong-il also wrote song lyrics. 

Kim wrote  particularly much on the arts. For instance 22 out of 46 works in volume one of his Selected Works (1964–1969) are on the topic. His first truly major literary work was also on the theme, On the Art of the Cinema (1973).

Bibliography

See also 

 Juche
 Pulgasari, a motion picture epic produced by Kim Jong-il
 Kim Il-sung bibliography
 Kim Jong-un bibliography
 Marxist bibliography

References

Works cited

External links 

 Works of Kim Jong-il at Publications of the DPRK
 Books and articles  at Korean Friendship Association
 Audio excerpts at Voice of Korea
 Kim Jong-il at the Marxists Internet Archive 

 
Bibliographies by writer
Communist books